The  was an army of the Imperial Japanese Army during the final days of World War II.

History
The Japanese 36th Army was formed on July 21, 1944 under the Japanese 12th Area Army as part of the last desperate defense effort by the Empire of Japan to counter the projected invasion of the Japanese capital region by Allied forces during Operation Downfall. It was based in Urawa city, Saitama prefecture to the north of the Tokyo metropolitan area, from which it could be used to reinforce units to either the north or south of Tokyo as necessary.

The Japanese 36th Army consisted mostly of poorly trained reservists, conscripted students and Volunteer Fighting Corps home guard militia. It was demobilized at the surrender of Japan on August 15, 1945 without having seen combat.

List of commanders

Commanding officer

Chief of Staff

References

External links

36
Military units and formations established in 1945
Military units and formations disestablished in 1945